Nagbabagang Luha is a 1988 Filipino romantic drama film directed by Ishmael Bernal and produced by Regal Films, adapted from the "komik" of the same name by Elena Patron. It stars Lorna Tolentino, Gabby Concepcion, Richard Gomez, and Alice Dixson. The film was released on July 7, 1988.

Plot
A couple, Alex, a businessman and Maita get a divorce after eight years of marriage as their marriage turns cold. They both love their only child Yeye a daughter, greatly and fight for her custody. The custody is given to the mother, but Alex takes her with him to the States. Maita asks her sister Cielo to pick up her daughter from Alex. The two sisters' plan fails when Alex confesses his true feelings for his sister in-law and the two fall madly in love. Then Maita goes to get her daughter by herself. Circumstances become more complicated when Alex's mother interferes.

Cast
Lorna Tolentino as Maria Teresa "Maita" Zaragosa
Gabby Concepcion as Alex Montaire
Richard Gomez as Bien De Dios
Alice Dixson as Cielo Zaragosa
Gloria Romero as Imelda Montaire
Honey Mae Ledesma as Teresa "Yeye" Montaire 
Olivia Cenizal as Mercedes "Cedes" L. Zaragosa

Critical response
Agustin Sotto, writing for Variety International Film Guide, considered the film "overwrought".

Home media
Nagbabagang Luha was released on DVD by Regal Home Video in 2008, although it was miscredited to director Mel Chionglo.

Accolades
The film won the awards for Best Supporting Actress (Gloria Romero) and Best Musical Score (Willy Cruz) at the 1989 FAMAS Awards.

Remake
A television remake by GMA Network was broadcast in 2021, starring Glaiza de Castro, Rayver Cruz, Mike Tan, and Claire Castro.

References

External links

1988 films
1988 romantic drama films
Filipino-language films
Films directed by Ishmael Bernal
Films set in the United States
Philippine romantic drama films
Regal Entertainment films